Karl Prantl is the name of:

 Karl Prantl (sculptor) (1923–2010), Austrian sculptor
 Karl Anton Eugen Prantl (1849–1893), German botanist
 Karl von Prantl (1820–1888), German philosopher and philologist